George Olcott Proctor (February 23, 1847 – March 4, 1925) was an  American politician who served in the Massachusetts House of Representatives and as the tenth Mayor, of Somerville, Massachusetts.

Notes

1847 births
Massachusetts city council members
People from Rockingham, Vermont
Republican Party members of the Massachusetts House of Representatives
Mayors of Somerville, Massachusetts
1925 deaths